This list of University of Puerto Rico people includes alumni, faculty, and presidents of University of Puerto Rico systemwide.

US Armed Forces 
Ricardo Aponte, brigadier general, U.S. Air Force
Salvador E. Felices, major general, U.S. Air Force
Jacob Lozada, colonel, U.S. Army, assistant secretary of veterans affairs
José Antonio Muñiz, lieutenant colonel, U.S. Air Force; together with then-Colonels Alberto A. Nido and Mihiel Gilormini he founded the Puerto Rico Air National Guard. In 1963, the Air National Guard Base, at the San Juan International airport in Puerto Rico, was renamed "Muñiz Air National Guard Base" in his honor.
Antonio J. Ramos, brigadier general, U.S. Air Force
Pedro N. Rivera, brigadier general, U.S. Air Force

Business 

Gildo Massó, founder and CEO of Masso Enterprises

Sports

Bernie Williams, former New York Yankees center fielder, MLB

Science 

Ricardo Alegría, scholar, cultural anthropologist and archeologist known as the "Father of Modern Puerto Rican Archaeology"
Rafael L. Bras, American civil engineer, currently serves as provost to the Georgia Institute of Technology
Nitza Margarita Cintron, scientist, currently the chief of space medicine and health care systems at NASA
Orlando Figueroa, director of the Mars Exploration Program in NASA
Enectalí Figueroa-Feliciano, astrophysicist and researcher with the NASA who pioneered the development position-sensitive detectors
Adolfo Figueroa-Viñas, Ph.D., first Puerto Rican astrophysicist at the National Aeronautics and Space Administration (NASA) and is an expert in solar and space plasma physics at the Heliophysics Science Division
Joxel García, Puerto Rican physician and former four-star admiral in the U.S. Public Health Service Commissioned Corps
Sixto Gonzalez, first Puerto Rican to be named director of the Arecibo Observatory, the world's largest single-dish radio telescope
Olga D. González-Sanabria, Puerto Rican scientist and inventor and the highest-ranking Hispanic at NASA Glenn Research Center
Amri Hernandez-Pellerano, Puerto Rican electronics engineer and scientist
Ramón López Irizarry, educator and scientist who invented "Coco Lopez"
Antonio Mignucci, biological oceanographer specializing in the biology, management and conservation of marine mammals
Enrique Pérez Santiago, first Puerto Rican hematologist, he began the formal program at the University of Puerto Rico Hospital
Mercedes Reaves, Puerto Rican research engineer and scientist
Pedro Rodriguez, director of a test laboratory at NASA and inventor
Helen Rodriguez Trias, women's rights activist and recipient of the Presidential Citizen's Medal.

Liberal arts 
Magali Carrasquillo, actress and teacher
Juan Antonio Corretjer, poet, journalist and pro-independence political activist opposing United States rule in Puerto Rico
Luz Odilia Font, actress
Luis Roberto Guzmán, musician, TV and film actor, two-time nominee for "TVyNovela" awards.
Enrique Laguerre, writer, poet, teacher and critic
Rubén Sánchez, main radio news personality at Univisión Radio (WKAQ-AM) as well as anchorman for several TV daily news interview programs

Law and politics 
Aníbal Acevedo Vilá (B.A. 1982, J.D. 1985), 8th governor of Puerto Rico (2005–2009), U.S. representative (Resident Commissioner), D-Puerto Rico (2001–2004), state representative, Puerto Rico House of Representatives (1992–1999).
José Aponte (B.B.A. 1980), state representative, Puerto Rico House of Representatives (2001–present).
Norma Burgos (B.A., M.P.A.), state senator, Puerto Rico Senate (2001–present).
Sila M. Calderón (M.P.A.), 7th governor of Puerto Rico (2001–2005), mayor of San Juan, Puerto Rico (1997–2001).
Antonio Fas Alzamora (J.D.), state senator, Puerto Rico Senate (1977–present), state representative, Puerto Rico House of Representatives (1973–1977).
Ruth Fernández, former senator, Puerto Rico Senate
Rogelio Figueroa, 2008 gubernatorial candidate for the Puerto Ricans for Puerto Rico (PPR) party
Miguel A. García Méndez, former Speaker of the Puerto Rico House of Representatives
Rafael Hernández Colón, 4th Governor of Puerto Rico first term (1973–1977), second term (1985–1993, state senator, Puerto Rico Senate (1969–1973).
Hans Hertell, former United States Ambassador to the Dominican Republic
Jesús T. Piñero, first native Puerto Rican to be appointed governor of Puerto Rico by the Government of the United States
Juan Mari Brás, advocate for Puerto Rican independence from the United States who founded the Puerto Rican Socialist Party (PSP).
Wilfredo Mattos Cintrón, teacher at the university, advocate of Puerto Rican independence who was, along with Mari Brás, a member of the PSP. 
Kenneth McClintock, current Secretary of State of Puerto Rico, fulfilling the role of lieutenant governor (first-in-line of succession) in the U.S. territory.
Adolfo L. Monserrate Anselmi, former state representative, Puerto Rico House of Representatives
Luis Negrón López, state senator, Puerto Rico Senate
 Carlos Romero Barceló (J.D. 1956), U.S. representative (Resident commissioner), D-Puerto Rico (1993–2000), 5th governor of Puerto Rico (1977–1985), state senator, Puerto Rico Senate (1986–1988), mayor of San Juan, Puerto Rico (1969–1977).
 Pedro Rosselló (M.P.H. 1981), 6th governor of Puerto Rico (1993–2001), state senator, Puerto Rico Senate (2005–2008).
Nydia Velázquez (B.A. 1974), U.S. representative, D-New York (1993–present)

Other 
 Juan Miguel Betancourt, Catholic bishop
F. Javier Cevallos, president of Kutztown University of Pennsylvania
Danyeshka Hernández, Miss Universe Puerto Rico 2017
Luis S. Fraticelli, FBI director for Puerto Rico
Mariblanca Sabas Alomá, Cuban feminist and journalist
Carlos E. Santiago, current chancellor of the University of Wisconsin–Milwaukee and chief executive officer in Hispanic College Fund
María Reinat-Pumarejo, activist

Notable faculty 

Eugenio S. Belaval
Ruben Berrios, law professor at the University of Puerto Rico's Law School
Facundo Bueso Sanllehí - Guggenheim Fellow, physicist and educator
Carlos Díaz Olivo, candidate for mayor of San Juan in 1992, corporate law professor
Edwin Irizarry Mora, candidate for governor of Puerto Rico in the 2008, professor of economics
Juan Ramón Jiménez, Spanish poet, a prolific writer who received the Nobel Prize in Literature in 1956
Luce López-Baralt, professor of Spanish and comparative literature at the University of Puerto Rico, Rio Piedras
Carolina Marcial Dorado, Spanish language professor
Roberto Sánchez Vilella, second Governor of the Commonwealth of Puerto Rico from 1965 to 1969
Luisa R. Seijo Maldonado, (MSW 1972) activist, social worker and professor at the University of Puerto Rico, Mayagüez
Pedro Juan Soto, Puerto Rican writer
Rexford Tugwell, served as the last appointed American Governor of Puerto Rico from 1941 to 1946, also served as chancellor of the University of Puerto Rico

Presidents

Alumni associations
Association of the University of Puerto Rico Alumni and Friends Abroad (UPRAA).

References

University of Puerto Rico